Ryan Joyce (born 20 September 1985) is a professional English darts player who plays in Professional Darts Corporation (PDC) events.

Career

BDO
In 2014 he reached the Last 48 of the World Masters. He took part in the 2016 BDO World Trophy, he was knocked out in the first round losing to Jamie Hughes. He has qualified for the 2017 BDO World Darts Championship, where he won 3–0 against Dennis Nilsson in the Preliminary round. In the First Round, he lost to Martin Adams 2–3 in a sudden death leg, after throwing for the match twice and missing one dart at double 18 to win followed by Adams hitting a 115 checkout to stay in the match, before Joyce himself survived a dart at 5-4 down before hitting a 164 checkout to take the game to the deciding leg.

Outside of the major tournaments he has reached 3 BDO ranked event finals, the first was the 2013 Turkish Open where he lost 5–0 to Martin Phillips, then the Isle of Man Open in 2016, losing 6–4 to Tony O'Shea also the Denmark Masters in 2016 losing 6–4 to Glen Durrant. He has had more success in pairs competitions winning the Turkish open pairs 2013, Welsh open pairs 2015 and losing in the final of the British open pairs 2016 all while partnering Andy Chalmers. He won the Scottish open pairs 2017 title with Kevin McDine. His most recent success came in the BDO Gold cup singles tournament 2017 which he won beating Wayne Warren 6–3 in the final.

In October 2017 Joyce along with Kevin McDine, Andy Lynn, Alan Davey, David Gradwell, Shaun Pomeroy and Tony Hardy won the National Punch Tavern pub darts team event, representing the Black Bull of Blaydon defeating The Red Lion of Bradford. The Red Lion team included Double BDO World Champion Scott Waites and former British open winner Martin Atkins. The Black Bull won 6–5 with Shaun Pomeroy defeating Martin Atkins in the nail biting deciding leg.

PDC

He joined the PDC in 2018 after a successful first attempt at Q school and after a very good first year qualified for the 2019 PDC World Darts Championship, and drew Anastasia Dobromyslova in round 1, winning the match 3–0. He then went on to take out three seeded players, defeating Simon Whitlock 3–0, Alan Norris 4-3 and James Wade 4–3. However, he was beaten in the quarter finals 5-1 by Michael van Gerwen. This was his debut appearance in the PDC World Championship.

In July 2020 he won his first PDC title at the Summer series pro tour event at Milton Keynes. Victories over Andy Hamilton, Luke Humphries, Chris Dobey, Madars Razma, Glen Durrant and Gary Anderson set up a final with Dave Chisnall. Ryan winning 8–7.

World Championship results

BDO
 2017: First round: (lost to Martin Adams 2–3) (sets)

PDC
 2019: Quarter-finals (lost to Michael van Gerwen 1–5)
 2020: First round (lost to Jan Dekker 2–3)
 2021: Second round (lost to Krzysztof Ratajski 0–3)
 2022: Second round (lost to Mervyn King 2–3)
 2023: First round (lost to Scott Williams 1–3)

Performance timeline 

PDC European Tour

(W) Won; (F) finalist; (SF) semifinalist; (QF) quarterfinalist; (#R) rounds 6, 5, 4, 3, 2, 1; (RR) round-robin stage; (Prel.) Preliminary round; (DNQ) Did not qualify; (DNP) Did not participate; (NH) Not held; (EX) Excluded; (WD) Withdrew

References

External links
 

Living people
English darts players
English people of Irish descent
British Darts Organisation players
Sportspeople from Newcastle upon Tyne
1985 births
PDC ranking title winners
Professional Darts Corporation current tour card holders